MES's College of Arts and Science, Sirsi is one of the institutions affiliated to Karnataka University, Dharwad. This college has received recognition from National Assessment and Accreditation Council (NAAC). The college offers bachelor of arts degrees in economics, political science, history, geography, statistics, Kannada, English, Hindi, Sanskrit, music, journalism and bachelor of science degrees in physics, chemistry, mathematics, electronics, computer science, and biotechnology.

References

Colleges in Karnataka
Universities and colleges in Uttara Kannada district